Yanjing (燕京 yānjīng) is the ancient capital of the State of Yan and a former name of Beijing.

Yanjing may also refer to:

 An alternative name for Nanjing, the name for Beijing during the Liao dynasty (907–1125)
 Beijing Yanjing Brewery, or Yanjing Beer
 Yanjing, Li County (盐井镇), a town in Li County, Hunan Province, China

See also
Yanjin (disambiguation)
Yanqing (disambiguation)